Nana Mizuki "Live Attraction" the DVD is the 1st live DVD release from J-pop star and voice actress Nana Mizuki, documenting her fourth concert Live Attraction in Winter 2002-2003. Most songs performed were from her second album Magic Attraction.

Track listing

 Theme of Magic Attraction
 Through the Night
 Climb Up
 Stand
 Deep Sea
 
 Protection

 Power Gate

 Transmigration
 Power Gate (Acappella)

Special features

 Behind the Scene

External links
Information on official website

Nana Mizuki video albums
Live video albums
2003 video albums